Hairy Knob is a summit in Mason County, Texas, in the United States.

References

Landforms of Mason County, Texas
Mountains of Texas